Fred Astaire Dance Studios, Inc. is a ballroom dance franchise chain of studios in the United States and Canada, named after and co-founded by famous dancer Fred Astaire. It is headquartered in Longmeadow, Massachusetts, USA.

The company was co-founded by Astaire along with Charles and Chester Casanave in 1947. Astaire divested his interest in the chain in 1966, while agreeing the continued use of his name by the franchise. The studios became franchised in 1950; currently there are no corporate owned studios. Each franchise is individually owned & operated. Currently there are 140 Fred Astaire studios in the United States alone. As of December 2010, Fred Astaire Dance Studios will now be franchising around the world and has studios opened in countries like Lebanon and South Africa.

Notable associates
The following dancers worked for and or started with Fred Astaire Dance Studios and won at least one United States Dance Championship.
 Tony Dovolani (Rhythm)
 Tony Dovolani & Elena Grinenko (Rhythm)
 Jose DeCamps (Rhythm)              * [Bruce and Mary Christopherson] 1982-1983 winners of United States Pre Champ, Rising Star, Hustle, and runner-up American Open in both American Smooth and Rhythm. Over 35 state and regional titles.

References 

Dance schools in the United States
Franchises
Dance schools in Canada
Ballroom dance
American companies established in 1947
Companies based in Hampden County, Massachusetts
1947 establishments in the United States